Brazil made its Paralympic Games debut at the 1972 Summer Paralympics in Heidelberg, sending representatives to compete in track and field, archery, swimming and wheelchair basketball. The country has competed in every edition of the Summer Paralympics since.

Until the 2020 Summer Paralympics, Brazilians have won a total of 378 Paralympic medals, of which 110 golds, 135 silvers and 133 bronzes. This places the country 19th on the all-time Paralympic Games medal table.

Brazil's first delegations experienced little success. No medals were won in 1972, and the country's only medal in 1976 was a silver, in the men's pairs in lawn bowls (through Robson S. Almeida and Luiz Carlos Costa). There were no medals either in 1980, but Brazilian Paralympians found notable success as from 1984, where they obtained their first gold: M. Ferraz won five silver medals and one gold in track and field; Márcia Malsar took three medals in athletics, of which the first gold for a brazilian athlete; Luis Claúdio Pereira won four medals, of which two gold, in track and field; as did Amintas Piedade. Swimmer Maria Jussara Matas obtained three medals, of which one gold, while Marcelo Amorim won four medals (three swimming and a bronze), also in swimming.

Pereira won three of Brazil's four gold medals in 1988, the fourth coming from swimmer Graciana Moreira Alves. In 1992, four Brazilian athletes each won a gold medal in track and field, while the country's two gold in 1996 were won in swimming (José Arnulfo Medeiros) and Judo (Antônio Tenório). Da Silva took another gold in 2000, adding to Brazil's four golds in track and field and one in swimming that year. The 2004 Games saw the country's best result to date, with fourteen gold medals, of which five in athletics. Swimmer Clodoaldo Silva became Brazil's most successful Paralympian in history, winning six gold medals in the pool, and Brazil also started the men's football 5-a-side dominination, defeating Argentina in a penalty shoot-out in the final. (In the 7-a-side event, Brazil finished second, after a 1-4 defeat to Ukraine.) In 2008, athletics provided another four gold medals, boccia two, Judo one, and swimming eight (four each from Daniel Dias and André Brasil). In football, Brazil finished fourth in the 7-a-side event, with losses to Ukraine (0-6) and Iran (0-4) in the final round. The country did, however, successfully defend for the first time its Paralympic title in 5-a-side football, defeating China 2-1 in the final.

Brazil debuted at the 2014 Winter Paralympics in Sochi, sending two athletes. This made Brazil the second tropical nation ever to have competed at the Winter Paralympics, after Uganda and the third country in South America to have done so, the others being Chile and Argentina.

Medal tables

Medals by Summer Games
This are the historical medal table for Brasil at the Summer Paralympics. This medal table also includes the 5 medals (1 gold, 3 silvers and 1 bronze) won at the 1992 Summer Paralympics for Intelectualy Disabled, held in Madrid, who also organized by then International Coordenation Committee (ICC) and same Organzing Committee (COOB'92) who made the gestion of the 1992 Summer Paralympics held in Barcelona and also part of same event. But the results are not on the International Paralympic Committee 's (IPC) database.

Winter Paralympics

Medals by Sport 1960–2020

Flagbearers

See also
 Brazil at the Olympics

References